Hmmsim Metro is a simulation game on the Seoul Subway Line 1. The game was released in Early Access in June 2021, and is expected to be officially released in December 2021.

The game is not officially licensed by the operators of the line, and thus does not feature Seoul Subway branding.

Gameplay
Hmmsim Metro is a simulation game that can be operated from Seoul Subway Line 1 to Kwangwoon University station and Geumcheon-gu Office Station. The trains that can be played are the 1st, 2nd, and 3rd generation trains of the Korail Class 311000.

References

External links

2021 video games
Seoul Metropolitan Subway
Simulation software
Single-player video games
Train simulation video games
Video games set in Seoul
Windows games